Veronica Cojuhari (born 3 October 1998) is a Moldovan footballer who plays as a midfielder and a forward for Women's Championship club Shakhtar Donetsk and the Moldova women's national team.

She played for Ukrainian club Voskhod Stara Mayachka (near Kherson) for the second half of 2020–21 season of Ukrainian top tier. At summer break she signed up with newly created women team of Shakhtar Donetsk that entered the second tier competitions.

References

1998 births
Living people
Moldovan women's footballers
Women's association football midfielders
Women's association football forwards
Moldova women's international footballers
Moldovan expatriate women's footballers
Moldovan expatriate sportspeople in Ukraine
Expatriate women's footballers in Ukraine